Datina can refer to two different species of fish:
 Acanthopagrus latus
 Acanthopagrus morrisoni